Henri Dutilleux's Symphony No. 2 Le Double is an orchestral work completed in 1959, commissioned by the Koussevitzky Music Foundation for the 75th anniversary of the Boston Symphony Orchestra. It is written for an orchestra and a second group comprising an oboe, a clarinet, a bassoon, a trumpet, a trombone, two violins, a viola, a cello, a harpsichord, a celesta, and timpani.

Overview
The work consists of back-and-forth interaction between the two instrumental groups, like that of a concerto grosso although the approach is different: in this piece, the smaller ensemble acts as a mirror or ghost of the larger one, sometimes playing similar or complementary lines, sometimes contrasting ones.

In Dutilleux's own words:

Structure
The symphony has three movements, a performance taking around a half-hour.

References

Compositions by Henri Dutilleux
1959 compositions
Dutilleux 2
Music commissioned by Serge Koussevitzky or the Koussevitzky Music Foundation
Music dedicated to ensembles or performers